Kalateh-ye Saru (also Romanized as Kalāteh-ye Sarū) is a village in Zeberkhan Rural District, Zeberkhan District, Nishapur County, Razavi Khorasan Province, Iran. At the 2006 census, its population was 47, in 9 families.

References 

Populated places in Nishapur County